David Kobia is a Kenyan programmer and one of the co-founders of Ushahidi. He programmed the first version of the site. Kobia was named "'Humanitarian of the Year" by MIT's Technology Review. In 2011, Kobia accepted a Webby Award on behalf of Ushahidi.

References 

Living people
Computer programmers
Year of birth missing (living people)